My Last Love is a 1999 Tv movie directed by Michael Schultz and starring Nancy Travis.

Plot
A dying woman moves to California where she meets a younger man and makes arrangements for daughters future.

References

Cast
Nancy Travis as Susan Morton
Scott Bairstow as Michael Blake
Jamie Renee Smith as Carson Morton
James Karen as Phil Morton
Holland Taylor as Marnie Morton
Viveka Davis as Kate

Films set in California
1999 television films
1999 films
Films directed by Michael Schultz
1990s English-language films